Muhammad ibn Abd Al-Haqq (Arabic: محمد بن عَبد الحَقّ; died 1244) was a Marinid ruler. He was the son of Abd al-Haqq I and the brother of Uthman I. 

He continued to fight the Almohads especially around the city of Meknes. 

Muhammad ibn Abd al-Haqq died during a battle against the Almohads in 1244 when he was killed by an officer of the Almohad army.

References
"Marinids." The Encyclopedia of Islam, Volume 6, Fascicules 107-108. pg. 571

1244 deaths
13th-century Berber people
13th-century monarchs in Africa
Marinid dynasty
Year of birth unknown